Jacques Séraphin Marie Audiberti (March 25, 1899 – July 10, 1965) was a French playwright, poet and novelist and exponent of the Theatre of the Absurd.

Audiberti was born in Antibes, France, the son of Louis Audiberti, a master mason, and his wife, Victorine. He began his writing career as a journalist, moving to Paris in 1925 to write for Le Journal and Le Petit Parisien. Later, he wrote more than 20 plays on the theme of conflicting good and evil.

He married Élisabeth-Cécile-Amélie Savane in 1926. They had two daughters, Jacqueline (born 1926) and Marie-Louise (born 1928). He died in Paris in 1965, aged 66, and is interred in the Cimetière de Pantin, Pantin, Ile-de-France Region, France

Works

Plays
 Le mal court (1947)
 L'effet Glapion (1959)
 La Fourmi dans le corps (1962)
 Quoat-Quoat
 L'Ampélour
 Les femmes du bœuf

Poetry
 Des Tonnes de semence (1941)
 Toujours (1944)
 Rempart (1953)

Novels
 Le Maître de Milan (1950)
 Marie Dubois (1952)
 Les jardins et les fleuves (1954)
 Infanticide préconisé (1958)

Other
 La Poupée, a film scenario adapted from an earlier novel
 Dimanche m'attend'', a diary published in (1965)

References

1899 births
1965 deaths
People from Antibes
20th-century French male writers
20th-century French dramatists and playwrights